In Norse mythology, Gylfi, Gylfe, Gylvi, or Gylve was the earliest recorded king in Scandinavia. He often uses the name Gangleri when appearing in disguise. The traditions on Gylfi deal with how he was tricked by the gods and his relations with the goddess Gefjon.

The creation of Zealand
The Ynglinga saga section of Snorri's Heimskringla and the Eddic poem Ragnarsdrápa tell a legend of how Gylfi was seduced by the goddess Gefjon to give her as much land as she could plow in one night. Gefjon transformed her four sons into oxen and took enough land to create the Danish island of Zealand, leaving the Swedish lake Vänern.

Meeting the Æsir

Gylfaginning in the Prose Edda and the Ynglinga saga tell how the supposedly historic (non-deified version) Odin and his people the Æsir and Vanir, who later became the Swedes, obtained new land where they built the settlement of Old Sigtuna. In Snorri's account Gylfi is supposedly deluded by the Æsir into accepting their religion; hence the name "Gylfaginning," most often interpreted as the "deluding of Gylfi", although '-ginning' is regarded the same as what we recognise in "beginning", thus "the origin of Gylfi" is also possible. Gylfi and the remaining older bronze-age inhabitants of the land then supposedly adopted the religion of the Æsir and began to live under their rule. Snorri presents an outline of Norse mythology through a dialogue between Gylfi and three rulers of the Æsir.

It is possible that Snorri's account is based on an old tradition tracing particular beliefs or foundations of particular Norse cults to this legendary Gylfi. However, it is much more likely that the historic King Gylfi was simply already a follower of the ancient Norse religion and, as such, could easily have passed on these beliefs or stories.

Other appearances
In one version of Hervarar saga, king Gylfi married his daughter Heiðr to Sigrlami, the king of Garðaríki (Russia). Heiðr and Sigrlami had the son Svafrlami, who forced the two dwarves Dvalin and Durin to forge the magic sword Tyrfing.

Notes

Mythological kings of Sweden